What the Brothers Sang is an album by Dawn McCarthy (of Faun Fables) and Bonnie 'Prince' Billy. The album was released on February 19, 2013. The album features covers of songs that appeared on albums by The Everly Brothers. The duo preceded this album with the "Christmas Eve Can Kill You" 7" single in late 2012, also featuring two covers of songs earlier performed by the Everlys. What the Brothers Sang was the first of three major albums released in 2013 to feature Everly Brothers covers in their entirety, the second being A Date with the Everly Brothers by the Chapin Sisters and the third being Foreverly by Billie Joe Armstrong and Norah Jones.

Critical reception 

The album received generally favorable reviews, with a cumulative score of 77/100 based on 16 reviews on the Metacritic review aggregator website.

Track listing

Personnel 

 John Barron - euphonium, trombone
 John Catchings - cello
 Billy Contreras - fiddle
 Dan Dugmore - steel guitar, guitar
 David Ferguson - vocals, guitar
 Nils Frykdahl - flute
 Emmett Kelly - guitar, vocals
 Kenny Malone - drums
 Ian McAllister - euphonium, trombone
 Dawn McCarthy - vocals
 Pat McLaughlin - vocals
 Joey Miskulin - accordion
 John Mock - mandolin, harmonium
 Will "Bonnie Prince Billy" Oldham - vocals
 Dave Roe - bass
 Matt Sweeney - guitar
 Noah Taggart - sousaphone, tuba
 Peter Townsend - percussion
 Dr. Chris Vivio - tuba
 Bobby Wood - piano, organ

References

Will Oldham albums
2013 albums
Drag City (record label) albums